Plestiodon chinensis, the Chinese blue-tailed skink, is a species of lizard which is found in China and Vietnam.

Description 
The Chinese blue-tailed skink has an average snout-to-vent length (SVL) of 13 cm, with a total length of 35 cm. It is large and stout, with a broad head and a pale white underside. As juveniles mature, their body undergoes a change in color from a dark brown with three light dorsal stripes and a blue tail to a fully mature brownish green, complete with reddish spots on the flanks.

Entomology 
P. Chinensis was named after the skink's home in China.

References

chinensis
Reptiles described in 1838
Taxa named by John Edward Gray